Church of Our Lady of Mercy (Portuguese: Paróquia Nossa Senhora da Piedade) is located in Novo Hamburgo. The church was built between 1850 and 1886. The current building was previously a former chapel whose facade is from 1936.

Religious buildings and structures in Rio Grande do Sul
Buildings and structures in Novo Hamburgo
Roman Catholic churches in Brazil